Alder is an unincorporated community in Benton County, Oregon, United States.  Alder lies near U.S. Route 20 southeast of Blodgett on the Marys River in the Central Oregon Coast Range. The post office serving Alder was named Hipp.

Alder railroad station on Southern Pacific's Toledo Line (now owned by the Portland and Western Railroad) was established in 1911, but in 1922 the Post Office Department would not name the community's new post office "Alder" because of potential confusion with many other offices with the same name. The name "Hipp" was suggested by the office manager of the nearby Climax Lumber Company mill; the name was apparently made up from the initials of the first names of people who owned the mill. The office ran until 1930.

Wallowa County
There was also a historic community named Alder in Wallowa County.
The Wallowa County Alder never flourished, because of the proximity of the more successful Enterprise.

References

Unincorporated communities in Benton County, Oregon
1911 establishments in Oregon
Unincorporated communities in Oregon